Raquel Caño Domínguez (born 17 February 1984) is a Spanish female handballer for BM La Calzada and the Spanish national team.

She also competed in beach handball.

Achievements 
Beach Handball World Cup:
Winner: 2016
Spanish Queen's Cup:
Winner: 2018

References 

Living people
1984 births
Spanish female handball players
Beach handball players
Sportspeople from León, Spain
Competitors at the 2013 Mediterranean Games
Mediterranean Games competitors for Spain